This is a list of ambassadors from the United States to Cameroon. The American Embassy at Yaounde was established on January 1, 1960, with Bolard More as Chargé d'Affaires ad interim.

Ambassadors

See also
Embassy of Cameroon, Washington, D.C.
Cameroon – United States relations
Foreign relations of Cameroon
Ambassadors of the United States

References
United States Department of State: Background notes on Cameroon

External links
 United States Department of State: Chiefs of Mission for Cameroon
 United States Department of State: Cameroon
 United States Embassy in Yaounde

Cameroon

1960 establishments in Cameroon
United States